The Sawar Fort is a fort in the city of Sawar, Rajasthan, India.

References 

Forts in Rajasthan